Nísia Floresta National Forest is a national forest in the state of Rio Grande do Norte, Brazil.

Location

The Nísia Floresta National Forest lies in the municipality of Nísia Floresta in the state of Rio Grande do Norte.
It is in the Trairi River basin.
The region has a dry season from September to February and a rainy season from March to August.

The Nísia Floresta National Forest is in the Atlantic Forest biome.
Native Atlantic Forest vegetation covers 60% of the forest and an experimentation area with various types of fruit trees covers 40%.
The area used for experimental purposes until the end of the 1970s is in a relatively advanced stage of regeneration of the native forest.
This ant is not found in areas disturbed by human actions, so is a good indicator of a preserved environment.

Conservation

The Nísia Floresta National Forest was created by decree on 27 September 2001 and is administered by the Chico Mendes Institute for Biodiversity Conservation (ICMBio).
It is classed as IUCN protected area category VI (protected area with sustainable use of natural resources) with the objective of sustainable multiple use of forest resources and scientific research, with emphasis on methods for sustainable exploitation of native forests.
An advisory council was appointed on 22 October 2008. 
The management plan for the forest was approved on 10 September 2012.

Notes

Sources

2001 establishments in Brazil
National forests of Brazil
Protected areas of Rio Grande do Norte